Pulcifer is an unincorporated census-designated place in the town of Green Valley, Shawano County, Wisconsin, United States. As of the 2010 census, its population is 134.

History
The community was named after Daniel H. Pulcifer (1834–1896), who served in the Wisconsin State Assembly and also served as mayor of Shawano, Wisconsin.

Notable people
Otto A. Risum, Wisconsin State Assemblyman, farmer, and merchant, lived in Pulcifer; Risum served as chairman of the Green Valley Town Board.

References

External links

Census-designated places in Shawano County, Wisconsin
Census-designated places in Wisconsin